The 1937 All-Ireland Senior Hurling Championship was the 51st staging of the All-Ireland hurling championship since its establishment by the Gaelic Athletic Association in 1887. The championship began on 16 May 1937 and ended on 5 September 1937.

Limerick entered the championship as defending champions, however, they were defeated in the provincial stages. Tipperary won the title following a 3–11 to 0–3 victory over Kilkenny in the final.

Format

The All-Ireland Senior Hurling Championship was run on a provincial basis as usual. All games were played on a knockout basis whereby once a team lost they were eliminated from the championship. The format for the All-Ireland series of games ran as follows: 
 The winners of the Munster Championship advanced directly to the All-Ireland final.
 The winners of the Leinster Championship advanced directly to a lone All-Ireland semi-final.
 Galway, a team who faced no competition in the Connacht Championship, entered the championship at the All-Ireland semi-final stage where they played the Leinster champions.
 There were no representatives from the Ulster Championship in the All-Ireland series.

Results

Leinster Senior Hurling Championship

Munster Senior Hurling Championship

First round

Semi-finals

Final

All-Ireland Senior Hurling Championship

Championship statistics

Miscellaneous

 Westmeath arguably enjoy their best ever season of championship hurling. Three successive victories allowed them to qualify for their very first, and to date their only, Leinster decider.
 That All-Ireland final was the first to be played outside of Croke Park and, indeed, Dublin for thirty years. A builders' strike delayed the construction of the Cusack Stand in Croke Park meaning an alternative venue had to be found and the new FitzGerald Stadium in Killarney was chosen.

Sources

 Corry, Eoghan, The GAA Book of Lists (Hodder Headline Ireland, 2005).
 Donegan, Des, The Complete Handbook of Gaelic Games (DBA Publications Limited, 2005).

External links
 1937 All-Ireland Senior Hurling Championship results

References

1937